The Angels' Greatest Vol. II is the second compilation album by Australian hard rock group, the Angels, which was released in November 1985 via Epic Records. It peaked at No. 38 on the Kent Music Report Albums Chart. The album was re-released in 1998 by Shock Records as No Secrets.

Track listing 
All songs written by Doc Neeson, John Brewster & Rick Brewster except as noted.

Personnel 
 Producer – The Angels
 Producer [Consultants] – Vanda & Young
 Producer, Engineer – Mark Opitz
 Vocals – Doc Neeson
 Bass – Chris Bailey
 Vocals, Drums – Graham "Buzz" Bidstrup
 Vocals, Guitar [Lead] – Rick Brewster
 Vocals, Rhythm Guitar – John Brewster
 Written-By – Doc Neeson (tracks: 1, 2, 3, 4, 5, 6, 7, 8, 9, 10 to 11, 12) John Brewster, Rick Brewster (tracks: 1,2, 3, 4, 5, 6, 7, 8, to 9, 10, 11, 12)

Charts

References 

The Angels (Australian band) compilation albums
1985 greatest hits albums
Epic Records compilation albums
Sony Music Australia compilation albums